Eiernockerl (German for "egg dumplings") is a simple and popular Austrian dish of the Viennese cuisine.

Origin
Dumplings are popular in all regions of Austria. They are also found in sweets such as the Salzburger Nockerl, which, according to legend, was a specialty of Salome Alt, mistress of the Prince-Archbishopric of Salzburg, and the reason he was enamored of her.

Ingredients and variants
The typical ingredients for Eiernockerl are flour, eggs, milk, butter, and then salt, pepper, ground nutmeg, and for decoration chives. Eiernockerl is usually served with a side dish of green salad.

It is also made to use up leftover Nockerl. 

Some of the Austrian dumplings' main variants are: Krautspatzen, with sauerkraut roasted in butter; Apfelspatzen, with apples; and Erdäpfelspatzen, with peeled potatoes.

Alleged tie to Hitler
In 1997, Wolfgang Fröhlich, Holocaust denier and former district council member for the Freedom Party, alleged that Adolf Hitler's favorite food was Eiernockerl. Some restaurants in Austria started advertising the dish as a "daily special" for the 20th of April, which is Hitler's date of birth. Accordingly, many neofascists have taken to celebrate Hitler's birthday by eating Eiernockerl while they promote the ostensibly strictly culinary event on social media.

The allegation about the dish has not been historically confirmed, though Hitler was fond of Leberknödel (liver dumplings), and Eiernockerl is normally served in Austrian restaurants every day of the year.

See also
Wiener schnitzel
Spätzle
Backhendl
Gnocchi
Neo-Nazi coded symbols
Adolf Hitler and vegetarianism

References

External links
How to make Eiernockerln

Egg dishes
Austrian cuisine
European cuisine